Nothogomphodon is a genus of therocephalian therapsids. It is classified within the family Bauriidae and placed within its own subfamily, Nothogomphodontinae.

Description
Nothogomphodon was unusual among therocephalians for its sectorial dentition, a feature it shared with cynodonts and which would have allowed it to shear meat more effectively.

Species
There are two described species of Nothogomphodon: N. danilovi and N. sanjiaoensis. N. danilovi is the types species and is known from Russia, while N. sanjiaoensis is known from China. N. sanjiaoensis can be distinguished from N. danilovi by its ovate canine base and distinct gap between the canine and the first postcanine tooth.

References

Bauriids
Therocephalia genera
Permian synapsids
Extinct animals of Russia
Fossil taxa described in 1974
Taxa named by Leonid Petrovich Tatarinov
Anisian life